Eliran Avni is an Israeli pianist.

Eliran Avni is the creative director of Shuffle Concert, a musical group which allows members of the audience to select during a concert which pieces from the repertoire of the group will be performed.

References

External links
Official website

Living people
Year of birth missing (living people)
Place of birth missing (living people)